Northwest Orient Airlines Flight 2501 was a DC-4 propliner operating its daily transcontinental service between New York City and Seattle when it disappeared on the night of June 23, 1950. The flight was carrying 55 passengers and three crew members; the loss of all 58 on board made it the deadliest commercial airliner accident in America at the time. 

Witnesses reported hearing engine sputtering noises and a flash of light after the last radio transmission. A widespread search was commenced including using sonar and dragging the bottom of Lake Michigan with trawlers, but to no avail. Considerable light debris, upholstery, and human body fragments were found floating on the surface, but divers were unable to locate the plane's wreckage.

Cause 
It is known that Flight 2501 was entering a squall line and turbulence, but since the plane's wreckage underwater was not found, the cause of the crash was never determined. There is output from a hindcast simulation of the possible weather conditions during the event. The incident was reported on June 25 by The New York Times as follows:

{{quote|A Northwest Airlines DC-4 airplane with fifty-eight persons aboard, last reported over Lake Michigan early today, was still missing tonight after hundreds of planes and boats had worked to trace the craft or any survivors. All air and surface craft suspended search operations off Milwaukee at nightfall except the Coast Guard cutter Woodbine. The airplane, a four-engine 'air coach' bound from New York to Minneapolis and Seattle, was last heard from at 1:13 o'clock this morning, New York Time, when it reported that it was over Lake Michigan, having crossed the eastern shore line near South Haven, Mich. The craft was due over Milwaukee at 1:27 A.M. and at Minneapolis at 3:23 A.M. If all aboard are lost, the crash will be the most disastrous in the history of American commercial aviation. The plane carried a capacity load of fifty-five passengers and a crew of three, headed by Capt. Robert Lind, 35 years old, of Hopkins, Minn. In Minneapolis, Northwest Airlines said the craft was 'presumed to be down,' and that they were beginning notification of relatives of passengers. In his last report, Captain Lind requested permission to descend from 3,500 to 2,500 feet because of a severe electrical storm which was lashing the lake with high velocity winds. Permission to descend was denied by the Civil Aeronautic Authority because there was much more traffic at the lower altitude.}}

 Aftermath 

The missing airliner is the subject of an annual search by Michigan Shipwreck Research Associates (MSRA), a Michigan-based non-profit organization. The search effort began in 2004 as a joint venture between author and explorer Clive Cussler and the MSRA. Cussler ended his involvement in 2013, but sent his side-scan sonar operator back to Michigan in 2015, 2016, and 2017 to follow some leads discovered by MSRA.

In September 2008, MSRA affiliate Chriss Lyon, investigating the crash of Flight 2501, found an unmarked grave that contains the remains of some of the 58 victims. Valerie van Heest, MSRA co-director and author of the book Fatal Crossing, says human remains from the June 1950 crash into Lake Michigan washed ashore and were buried in a mass grave. She claims they were buried in a St. Joseph-area cemetery without the knowledge of the victims' families, and the grave was never marked. In a 2008 ceremony at the cemetery with 58 family members of Flight 2501, a large black granite marker, donated by Filbrandt Family Funeral Home, was placed in Riverview Cemetery that now lists the names of the 58 and the words "In Memory of Northwest Flight 2501, June 23, 1950. Gone but Never Forgotten."

Another mass burial site was discovered in 2015 at Lakeview Cemetery in South Haven. The site had long been unmarked, until cemetery sexton Mary Ann Frazier and her mother, Beverly Smith, working on a genealogy project, found it. The women contacted van Heest and together they planned a memorial service before the 65th anniversary. Filbrandt organized the service, which was led by Pastor Robert Linstrom. St. Joe Monument Works donated a marker for the gravesite; it was delivered to the cemetery a few days before the 65th anniversary of the crash. On June 24, 2015, a remembrance service was held at the grave site. South Haven Mayor Robert Burr, along with Craig Rich from the MSRA, read off all of the 58 victims' names. After each name was read, a bell was rung.

The crash was featured on an episode of the Discovery Channel program Expedition Unknown (season 8, episode 2), which aired on February 12, 2020.

 References 

Further reading
 Van Heest, Valerie (2013), Fatal Crossing: The Mysterious Disappearance of NWA Flight 2501 and the Quest for Answers  (In-Depth Editions, 2013)

 External links 
  (PDF direct link)
 "Volunteers try to solve mystery of 1950 plane crash in Lake Michigan," Milwaukee Journal Sentinel'' (March 10, 2014)
 "Another mass burial site discovered in Michigan cemetery," WZZM13
Mysterious Lake Michigan plane crash to be featured on Expedition Unknown SE6, Ep2 Feb 12, 2020 WZZM 13*

Transportation in Berrien County, Michigan
Lake Michigan
1950 in Michigan
Disasters in Michigan
Airliner accidents and incidents in Michigan
Aviation accidents and incidents in the United States in 1950
Airliner accidents and incidents with an unknown cause
Accidents and incidents involving the Douglas DC-4
2501
Missing aircraft
June 1950 events in the United States